Aleš Sova (born September 24, 1991) is a Czech professional ice hockey defenceman who plays for Orli Znojmo of the Erste Bank Eishockey Liga.

Playing career
Sova played with HC Kometa Brno in the Czech Extraliga during the 2010–11 Czech Extraliga playoffs whilst also enduring a loan a stint in the 1. národní hokejová liga with HC Rebel Havlíčkův Brod Sova later moved to play with Czech outfit, Orli Znojmo, who competed in the Austrian Hockey League (EBEL).

Following parts of two seasons in Denmark with Herning Blue Fox of the Metal Ligaen, Sova as a free agent opted to pursue a career in North America. He signed a one-year ECHL contract with the Quad City Mallards on September 11, 2017.

After an unsuccessful tenure in the ECHL, Sova returned to Denmark in joining the Frederikshavn White Hawks for the remainder of the season on January 31, 2018.

References

External links

1991 births
Anglet Hormadi Élite players
Asiago Hockey 1935 players
Czech ice hockey defencemen
Frederikshavn White Hawks players
Greenville Swamp Rabbits players
BK Havlíčkův Brod players
Herning Blue Fox players
LHK Jestřábi Prostějov players
Kansas City Mavericks players
HC Kometa Brno players
Living people
Orli Znojmo players
Quad City Mallards (ECHL) players
Ice hockey people from Brno
Czech expatriate ice hockey players in the United States
Czech expatriate sportspeople in Italy
Czech expatriate sportspeople in Denmark
Czech expatriate sportspeople in France
Expatriate ice hockey players in Denmark
Expatriate ice hockey players in France
Expatriate ice hockey players in Italy